The Bloody Tower is a 1938 detective novel  by John Rhode, the pen name of the British writer Cecil Street. It is the twenty ninth in his long-running series of novels featuring Lancelot Priestley, a Golden Age armchair detective. It was published in the United States the same year by Dodd Mead under the alternative title Tower of Evil. It is notable amongst Rhode's more realistic style during the series, for its Gothic elements. For The Guardian E. R. Punshon wrote "in The Bloody Tower Mr. John Rhode gives another excellent example of his eminently satisfactory and solid talent."

Synopsis
The crumbling Farningcote Priory has been the home of the Glapthorne family for generations. In the grounds stand a tower, built as a folly during the eighteenth century which seems to have a strange, almost mystical power over the family. When Caleb Clapthorne is killed in what at first appears to be a shooting accident, it soon proves to be murder. Yet Inspector Waghorn, in the area on the trail of a gang of thieves but called in to assist, fails to find any obvious motive. In the end he turns to Priestley to track down the vital clues.

References

Bibliography
 Evans, Curtis. Masters of the "Humdrum" Mystery: Cecil John Charles Street, Freeman Wills Crofts, Alfred Walter Stewart and the British Detective Novel, 1920-1961. McFarland, 2014.
 Magill, Frank Northen . Critical Survey of Mystery and Detective Fiction: Authors, Volume 3. Salem Press, 1988.
 Reilly, John M. Twentieth Century Crime & Mystery Writers. Springer, 2015.

1938 British novels
Novels by Cecil Street
British crime novels
British mystery novels
British detective novels
Collins Crime Club books
Novels set in England